A Schottky defect is an excitation of the site occupations in a crystal lattice leading to point defects named after Walter H. Schottky. In ionic crystals, this defect forms when oppositely charged ions leave their lattice sites and become incorporated for instance at the surface, creating oppositely charged vacancies. These vacancies are formed in stoichiometric units, to maintain an overall neutral charge in the ionic solid.

Definition
Schottky defects consist of unoccupied anion and cation sites in a stoichiometric ratio. For a simple ionic crystal of type A−B+, a Schottky defect consists of a single anion vacancy (A) and a single cation vacancy (B), or v + v  following Kröger–Vink notation. For a more general crystal with formula AxBy, a Schottky cluster is formed of x vacancies of A and y vacancies of B, thus the overall stoichiometry and charge neutrality are conserved. Conceptually, a Schottky defect is generated if the crystal is expanded by one unit cell, whose a prior empty sites are filled by atoms that diffused out of the interior, thus creating vacancies in the crystal.

Schottky defects are observed most frequently when there is a small difference in size between the cations and anions that make up a material.

Illustration
Chemical equations in Kröger–Vink notation for the formation of Schottky defects in TiO2 and BaTiO3. 

∅  v  + 2 v

∅  v  + v  + 3 v

This can be illustrated schematically with a two-dimensional diagram of a sodium chloride crystal lattice:

Bound and dilute defects

The vacancies that make up the Schottky defects have opposite charge, thus they experience a mutually attractive Coulomb force. At low temperature, they may form bound clusters.

The bound clusters are typically less mobile than the dilute counterparts, as multiple species need to move in a concerted motion for the whole cluster to migrate. This has important implications for numerous functional ceramics used in a wide range of applications, including ion conductors, Solid oxide fuel cells and nuclear fuel.

Examples
This type of defect is typically observed in highly ionic compounds, highly coordinated compounds, and where there is only a small difference in sizes of cations and anions of which the compound lattice is composed. Typical salts where Schottky disorder is observed are NaCl, KCl, KBr, CsCl and AgBr. For engineering applications, Schottky defects are important in oxides with Fluorite structure, such as CeO2, cubic ZrO2, UO2, ThO2 and PuO2.

Effect on density
Typically, the formation volume of a vacancy is positive: the lattice contraction due to the strains around the defect does not make up for the expansion of the crystal due to the additional number of sites. Thus, the density of the solid crystal is less than the theoretical density of the material.

See also
Frenkel defect
Wigner effect
Crystallographic defects

References

Notes

Crystallographic defects